The 2022 Trampoline Gymnastics World Championships was held in Sofia, Bulgaria from 16 to 19 November 2022.

Participating nations

  (3)
  (24)
  (2)
  (2)
  (5)
  (4)
  (3)
  (20)
  (11)
  (5)
  (2)
  (10)
  (7)
  (1)
  (1)
  (13)
  (2)
  (6)
  (23)
  (12)
  (10)
  (1)
  (5)
  (16)
  (5)
  (1)
  (8)
  (8)
  (5)
  (4)
  (24)
  (2)
  (13)
  (7)
  (5)
  (13)
  (23)
  (3)

Medal summary

Medal table

References

External links
Official website

Trampoline Gymnastics World Championships
Trampoline Championships
2022 in Bulgarian sport
Sports competitions in Sofia
Gymnastics in Bulgaria
Trampoline World Championships
Trampoline